Boston City Council elections were held on November 7, 2017. Nine seats in the Boston City Council (five district representatives and four at-large members) were contested in the general election, as the incumbents in districts 3, 4, 5, and 6 were unopposed. Four seats (districts 1, 2, 7, and 9) had also been contested in the preliminary election held on September 26, 2017.

At-large
Councillors Michelle Wu, Ayanna Pressley, Michael F. Flaherty, and Annissa Essaibi George were re-elected.

District 1
The seat formerly held by Salvatore LaMattina was won by Lydia Edwards. LaMattina had announced in April 2017 that he would not seek re-election.

District 2
The seat formerly held by Bill Linehan was won by Edward M. Flynn, son of former Mayor of Boston Raymond Flynn. Linehan had announced in February 2017 that he would not seek re-election.

District 3
Councillor Frank Baker ran unopposed and was re-elected.

District 4
Councillor Andrea Campbell ran unopposed and was re-elected.

District 5
Councillor Timothy McCarthy ran unopposed and was re-elected.

District 6
Councillor Matt O'Malley ran unopposed and was re-elected.

District 7
The seat formerly held by Tito Jackson (who lost in the Boston mayoral election) was won by Kim Janey.

 write-in votes

District 8
Councillor Josh Zakim was re-elected.

District 9
Councillor Mark Ciommo was re-elected.

See also
 List of members of Boston City Council
 Boston mayoral election, 2017

References

Further reading

External links
 2017 Election Results at boston.gov

City Council election
Boston City Council elections
Boston City Council election
Boston City Council